Our Lady of Laus or Refuge of Sinners denotes Marian apparitions that took place between 1664 and 1718 in Saint-Étienne-le-Laus, France, to Benoîte Rencurel, a young shepherdess. The apparitions were approved by the Holy See on 5 May 2008. Pope Pius IX granted a Canonical Coronation to her marble image on 23 May 1855.

Background

Situated in Dauphiné, in southern France at the foot of the Alps, just southeast of Gap, is the valley of Laus. Its name means "lake" in the local dialect, as there once was one at the bottom of the basin. In 1666 the hamlet held twenty households scattered in little huts. The inhabitants had built a chapel dedicated to the Annunciation, Notre-Dame de Bon Rencontre (means Our Lady of the Good Encounter, i.e., the Annunciation).

Apparitions
Benoite was born on September 16, 1647, into extreme poverty in the village of St Etienne d’Avancon. Her father died when she was only seven. By the time Benoite was twelve she took employment tending sheep.

In May 1664, the seventeen-year-old Benoite saw an apparition of Saint Maurice, a 3rd-century martyr who was greatly honored at Laus. This was near a nearby chapel, then in ruins, dedicated to St. Maurice. He warned her that if she remained in that area, the local guards would take her flock if they found it there. St. Maurice told the shepherdess to go to the Valley of Kilns, above Saint-Étienne, where she would see the Mother of God.

On May 16 Benoite took her sheep to the Valley of Kilns. She came to a grotto, when the Virgin Mary, holding the Child Jesus in her arms, appeared to her. Her offer to share the hard bread that she carried made the beautiful Lady smile, but she left without saying a word. For a period of about four months, the Lady came back every day, and Benoite heard her speak. Others could not hear what the Virgin Mary said. On August 29, the Lady told Benoite that her name was Mary.

The Lady instructed Benoite to go to Laus from her own village nearby and to look for her there, "where you will smell a very nice perfume". Benoite made her way to Laus and found an old chapel dedicated to Our Lady of the Good Encounter, and, while the smell of the beautiful perfume was there, the chapel was in bad condition. "It is my desire that a new chapel be built here in honour of my beloved Son. It will become a place of conversion for numerous sinners and I shall appear here very often," said the beautiful Lady.

Our Lady told Benoite that the oil from the sanctuary lamp would work miracles with the infirm if they received the anointing with faith in her intercession.

Message
Our Lady of Laus asked for sinners to do penance, a chapel of Eucharistic adoration to be built so Jesus could convert sinners, and a house for priests to be built so the priests could administer the sacraments to sinners.

At the heart of the message given to Benoite is a conversion of souls which aims to bring full reconciliation with oneself, with others, and with God.

Veneration
A few of the saints who have had a particular devotion to Our Lady of Laus include Saint Eugène de Mazenod (1782–1861), founder of the Oblates of Mary Immaculate; and Saint Peter Julian Eymard (1811–1868), founder of the Blessed Sacrament Fathers and of the Servants of the Blessed Sacrament. When Saint Peter Julian was eleven years old he made a sixty-kilometer pilgrimage on foot in order to pray for nine days at the shrine while preparing for his First Communion. Later he wrote, "That is where I first came to know and love Mary."

On May 5, 2008, Bishop Jean-Michel de Falco Leandri, Bishop of Gap, announced the Holy See's recognition of the apparitions as Our Lady of Laus, Refuge of Sinners.

See also
 Our Lady of Fátima
 Sanctuary of Fátima

References

External links

 Sanctuary of Our Lady of Laus — Official website

Catholic Church in France
Laus
Laus
Catholic devotions
Laus, Our Lady Of
Laus, Our Lady Of